Mir Ali or Mirali is a town in North Waziristan District, in Pakistan's Khyber Pakhtunkhwa province.

The residents of Mirali are Dawar and Utmanzai Wazirs. Wazirs reside in mountainous areas of North Waziristan such as Spinwam, Shawa, and Khiasur, while Dawars reside in plane areas on both sides of the Tochi River. Some well known villages of Dawars in Mirali area are Hassu Khel, Haider Khel, Mussaki, Idaak, Khaddi, Hurmaz, Zeraki, Hakim Khel and Daulat Khel etc.

History 
The famous Pashtun freedom fighter and tribal leader Mirzali Khan (Faqir of Ipi) based his movement in Ipi, a village on the outskirts of Mirali, for more than 10 years. In 1938, Mirzali Khan shifted from Ipi to Gurwek, Waziristan.

Abu Yahya al-Libi, the number two at the time of Al-Qaeda, was killed by a drone strike carried out by United States on June 4, 2012 in Mirali.

On December 30, 2021, a gunfight occurred between Pakistani troops and Tehrik-i-Taliban in the city, killing four people.

Notable people
Mirzali Khan
Tahir Dawar
Noor Islam Dawar

See also 
Battle of Mirali
Abu Laith al-Libi
Abu Obeida Tawari al-Obeidi

References

External links
Missile strike emphasizes al-Qaida problem MSNBC February 1, 2008
U.S. strikes in Pakistan — without notice MSNBC February 18, 2008

Populated places in North Waziristan
Waziristan